God is Love may refer to:

 "Whoever does not love does not know God, because God is love." - In 1 John, chapter 4:8
 "God is love. Whoever lives in love lives in God, and God in them." - In 1 John, chapter 4:16
 Deus caritas est - Latin for "God is Love", Pope Benedict XVI's first encyclical
 God Is Love - a work of art by Leonid Denysenko

Music
 "God Is Love" (Marvin Gaye song) - a song by Marvin Gaye
 God Is Love (album) - an album by Dave Fitzgerald
 "God Is Love", a song by Lenny Kravitz from his 1995 album Circus